Terry Dobson may refer to:

 Terry Dobson (aikidoka), American aikido pioneer
 Terry Dobson (singer), founding member of the pop band Black Lace